Trimethylaminuria (TMAU), also known as fish odor syndrome or fish malodor syndrome, is a rare metabolic disorder that causes a defect in the normal production of an enzyme named flavin-containing monooxygenase 3 (FMO3). When FMO3 is not working correctly or if not enough enzyme is produced, the body loses the ability to properly convert trimethylamine (TMA) from precursor compounds in food digestion into trimethylamine oxide (TMAO), through a process called N-oxidation. Trimethylamine then builds up and is released in the person's sweat, urine, and breath, giving off a fishy odor. Primary trimethylaminuria is caused by genetic mutations that affect the FMO3 function of the liver. Symptoms matching TMAU can also occur when there is no genetic cause, yet excessive TMA excreted - this has been described as secondary trimethylaminuria (TMAU2). TMAU2 can be caused simply by a precursor overload (ingesting too many dietary TMA precursors), hormonal issues related to menstrual cycles, liver damage, or liver and kidney failure. As a symptom rather than a disease, TMAU2 is temporary and will resolve as the underlying cause is remedied (in the instance of menstrual related TMAU2, at menopause).

Metabolic pathway 
Trimethylamine enters the body via the consumption of certain foods and supplements. When food is consumed that contains TMA and/or TMAO (predominately seafood; saltwater fish, shellfish, seaweed and kelp), TMAO is converted by bacteria in the lower gastrointestinal tract (gut) into TMA. Additionally, when a food substance, supplement or medicine containing a precursor (choline or carnitine) is ingested, bacteria in the gut convert a portion of those precursors to TMA. Moderate amounts of precursor are absorbed in the small intestine before reaching the gut, however if precursor rich food saturates the transport capacity of the intestine, excess precursor ends up in the gut. The proportion of precursor converted to TMA is related to the amount of specific bacteria in the gut.

TMA in the gut is absorbed through the intestinal lining and enters the bloodstream, where it is filtered by the liver. The liver usually produces an abundance of the enzyme FMO3, which neutralises the TMA by oxidising it to odourless TMAO, and passes it through to the bladder. If FMO3 enzyme production is compromised, or there is too much TMA for the amount of enzyme, then TMA will continue to circulate in the bloodstream until enough enzyme is produced. While TMA is in the bloodstream, it slowly exits the body in bodily fluids; urine, sweat, saliva, reproductive fluids and breath (See fluid balance for rates of fluid loss). TMA has no known interactions with any known internal or organ function.

Although lecithin, creatinine and betaine are technically precursors to TMA, pilot studies have shown no significant effect on the production of excess TMA/TMAO in urinary analysis at normal dietary levels of consumption. When taken in large quantities (12g/day) betaine has been known to cause fish odor symptoms, meaning that there is some conversion of betaine to TMA if supplements are taken regularly.

Symptoms and signs 
Trimethylamine is most noticeable in urine, as it is captured, concentrated and released in intervals. Fishy smelling urine is a primary identifying symptom in infant children (Trimethylaminuria literally meaning "trimethylamine in urine").

Trimethylamine is also released in the person's sweat, reproductive fluids, and breath, and can give off a fishy odor when the concentration of trimethylamine is high enough to be detected.  The intensity of the smell is directly correlated with the concentration of trimethylamine in the bloodstream.

Some people with trimethylaminuria report having a strong odor all the time, but when in a clinical setting most have only moderate to no smell, depending on diet and the severity of their FM03 mutation. In a study by Wise PM, of 115 identified tmau subjects, 0% had a smell detectable at a social distance and only 5% had some minor malodour when sniffing their palms. After a choline challenge load test (intentionally ingesting a TMA precursor) only 10% expressed a smell at a social distance, suggesting that those that produced odour had a more severe form of FMO3 impairment. Smell events are often sporadic and episodic in nature (based on diet over the previous 24 hours), making it often difficult to diagnose by smell alone.

Individuals with this condition do not have any physical symptoms, and they typically appear healthy.

The condition seems to be more common in women than men, for unknown reasons. Scientists suspect that such female sex hormones as progesterone and estrogen aggravate the condition. According to several reports, the condition worsens around puberty. In women, symptoms may worsen just before and during menstrual periods, after taking oral contraceptives, and around menopause.

Genetics 

Most cases of trimethylaminuria appear to be inherited in an autosomal recessive pattern, which means two copies of the gene in each cell are altered. The parents of an individual with an autosomal recessive disorder are both carriers of one copy of the altered gene. Carriers may have mild symptoms of trimethylaminuria or experience temporary episodes of fish-like body odor.

Mutations in the FMO3 gene, which is found on the long arm of chromosome 1, cause trimethylaminuria. The FMO3 gene makes an enzyme that breaks down nitrogen-containing compounds from the diet, including trimethylamine. These compounds are produced by bacteria in the intestine as they digest proteins from eggs, meat, soy, and other foods. Normally, the FMO3 enzyme converts fishy-smelling trimethylamine into trimethylamine N-oxide which has no odor. If the enzyme is missing or its activity is reduced because of a mutation in the FMO3 gene, trimethylamine is not broken down and instead builds up in the body. As the compound is released in a person's sweat, urine, and breath, it causes the strong odor characteristic of trimethylaminuria. Researchers believe that stress and diet also play a role in triggering symptoms.

There are more than 40 known mutations associated with TMAU. Loss-of-function mutations, nonsense mutations, and missense mutations are three of the most common. Nonsense and missense mutations cause the most severe phenotypes.

Although FMO3 mutations account for most known cases of trimethylaminuria, some cases are caused by other factors. A fish-like body odor could result from excess consumption of TMA precurors choline, carnitine and betaine (unobtainable via regular dietary intake, it requires high levels of supplement intake). A few cases of the disorder have been identified in adults with liver damage caused by hepatitis.

In 2007 the evolution of the FMO3 gene was studied, including the evolution of some mutations associated with TMAU.

Diagnosis 
Measurement of urine for the ratio of trimethylamine to trimethylamine oxide is the standard screening test. A blood test is available to provide genetic analysis. The prominent enzyme responsible for TMA N-oxygenation is coded by the FMO3 gene.

False positives can occur in the following conditions, where elevated TMA can be present in the urine without any underlying TMAU:

 Urinary tract infection
 Bacterial vaginosis
 Cervical cancer
 Advanced liver or kidney disease

A similar foul-smelling odor of the urine has also been associated with colonization of the urinary tract with a bacterium called Aerococcus urinae, especially in children.

Olfactory reference syndrome is a condition where there is a persistent false belief and preoccupation with the idea of emitting an abnormal body odor. According to McNiven at a canadian genetics clinic, 83% of referrals for genetic testing for TMAU were deemed likely to instead have ORS. Findings found that the use of “fecal/sewage” as a description, and the use of multiple descriptors of the smell, and 'incorrect' locations of smell origin effectively differentiated ORS from TMAU. In the literature on body odour identification, emphasis is frequently placed on multiple consultations to reduce the risk of misdiagnosis, and also asking the individual to have a reliable confidant accompany them to the consultation who can confirm the reality of the reported symptom. ORS patients are unable to provide such confidants as they have no objective odor.

A fecal smell (fecal body odour) is often a self reported symptom associated with TMAU, however there is no recorded evidence of fecal body odour present in any study related to TMAU. Cashman JR found that 53% of TMAU and 59% of non-TMAU subjects suffered from regular halitosis, dental plaque on the back of the tongue, which produced on average "200-600 ppb of sulfurous/fecal smelling volatile sulfur compounds (i.e., VSC: hydrogen sulfide; methylmercaptan; dimethylsulfide) with each exhalation, creating a “malodorous cloud” in their vicinity. It is likely that halitosis, ORS or in severe cases, a bowel obstruction leading to fecal vomiting may be the cause.

There is the possibility that someone may suffer from both Trimethylaminuria and ORS-like paranoia, due to the potential lack of ability to smell the odour oneself and the worry that it generates. It is recommended to organise reliable confidants, colleagues, friends or relatives ("smell buddies") to work with the sufferer to discretely inform them if they are presenting an odour.

Treatment 
There is no known permanent cure or treatment for primary trimethylaminuria, only mitigation of the effects. For secondary trimethylaminuria, it depends on the cause; for precursor overload, reducing the intake of TMA and its precursors will end symptoms. For TMAU caused by hypothetical gut dysbiosis, clinical review by a doctor, a plant based diet and reduced precursor intake should return gut flora to a healthy state.

Primary TMAU sufferers generally have some residual FMO3 activity in the liver which processes TMA, however this happens relatively slowly. According to a study by Al-Waiz M TMA filters through to the bladder at half the rate of TMAO, and a healthy functioning person passes 99% of TMAO in urine within 24 hours. Therefore it's estimated that the majority of TMA would be filtered out within 48 hours if no additional TMA or precursor is ingested, regardless of liver function.

The metabolic and clinical manifestations of TMAU are generally regarded as benign, as there is no associated organ dysfunction. This designation, and the fact that the condition is often unrecognised by doctors, misdiagnosed and can have important ramifications including missed or delayed diagnosis.

Affected individuals experience shame and embarrassment, fail to maintain relationships, avoid contact with people who comment on their condition, and are obsessive about masking the odour with hygiene products and even smoking. The malodorous aspect can have serious and destructive effects on schooling, personal life, career and relationships, resulting in social isolation, low self-esteem, depression, paranoid behaviour, and suicide. Delayed diagnosis, body odour and the lack of cure may lead to psychosocial issues. When the condition is suspected or known to occur in a family, genetic testing can be helpful in identifying the specific individuals who have or carry the disorder.

Ways of reducing the fishy odor may include:

 Avoiding all seafood, including fish, shellfish, kelp, seaweed. Seafood contains TMAO, which is converted to TMA in the stomach, and will directly raise TMA levels in the person. 
 Avoiding red meat (beef, lamb and pork), liver, offal, and foods and supplements that contain carnitine. A study performed by Wang Z found that when comparing diets where the main protein source was red meat, white meat and non-meat protein sources, consumption of red meat increased the production of TMAO, whereas white meat and non-meat protein diets generated only low to negligible amounts TMAO. This study indicates that red meat is a major driver of TMA production by altering the balance of microbiota in the stomach due to the carnitine found in red meat. A further study by Crimarco A found that a 8 week plant based diet significantly reduced TMAO production, and further, that after switching the diet to include animal based protein, TMAO production was less than the participants who had only been given an animal protein based diet. The findings suggest that the microbiome in the gut is modified by a plant based diet, and for a time a person will lack the bacteria required to convert choline and carnitine into TMA at the same rate of a animal protein based diet.
 Reducing the intake of fish, red meat, white meat, offal, egg yolks, legumes, beans, whey products, and other foods and supplements that contain high levels of choline. Choline is an essential nutrient so complete elimination of choline is unadvised. As above, white meat (chicken, turkey) and plant based products may be fine to consume if red meat is predominantly avoided. Note, while raw ingredients like soybeans have a relatively high choline content, some processed products like soy sauce, soy milk and tofu have low choline content, due to dilution of ingredients, small serving size, or removal as a byproduct during the manufacturing process. It's best to check the choline content of food and the portion size for a better understanding of how much choline is being consumed.
 Vitamin B2 at 50 mg per day in combination with diet resolved smell issues for 2 children with TMAU. B2 was found to increase residual FMO3 performance.
 Taking low doses of antibiotics such as neomycin and metronidazole in order to reduce the amount of bacteria in the gut, although this is not recommended as a long term solution due to antibiotic resistance and other side effects.
 Using slightly acidic detergent and body washes with a pH between 5.5 and 6.5

Additionally, at least one study has suggested that daily intake of the supplements activated charcoal and copper chlorophyllin may temporarily improve the quality of life of individuals afflicted with TMAU by helping their bodies to oxidize and convert TMA to the odorless N-oxide (TMAO) metabolite. Study participants experienced subjective reduction in odor as well as objective reduction in TMA and increase in TMAO concentration measured in their urine. The study found that:
 85% of test participants experienced complete loss of detectable "fishy" odor
 10% experienced some reduction in detectable odor
 5% did not experience any detectable odor reduction

History 
The first clinical case of TMAU was described in 1970. Her mother related that her child, a 6 year old girl, had intermittently had a peculiar "fishy" odour. Analysis of her urine showed an elevated level of trimethylamine, and that a chemially pure free base sample of trimethylamine smelled similar to the patient's fishy odor. They tested her condition by giving her more trimethylamine, which substantially increased her odour (which it did not in control subjects).

Notable media 
In 2014, singer/songwriter Cassie Graves was first featured in the Daily Mail, the Daily Mirror, and The Metro UK newspapers in both print and Online, giving an interview about her experiences with Trimethylaminuria. The article was later repurposed in media across the globe, most notably by HuffPost.

In 2016, Graves was then featured in Princess Productions' Medical Mysteries on UK's Channel 5, which went on a journey to find an official diagnosis for the condition, and again sparked a global media interest in the condition.

The 2010 novel Boxer, Beetle by Ned Beauman features a character with trimethylaminuria.

References

External links 

This article incorporates public domain text from The U.S. National Library of Medicine and The National Human Genome Research Institute

Inborn errors of metabolism
Autosomal recessive disorders
Rare diseases